Qeshlaq-e Hajji Shahab (also Romanized as Qeshlāq-e Ḩājjī Shahāb; also known as Qeshlāq) is a village in Behi Dehbokri Rural District, Simmineh District, Bukan County, West Azerbaijan Province, Iran. At the 2006 census, its population was 177, in 26 families.

References 

Populated places in Bukan County